Ray Cronin (born 1964) is a Canadian artist, journalists and contemporary art curator and has been Director and CEO of the Art Gallery of Nova Scotia since June 2008. Prior to his appointment, Cronin was the Art Gallery of Nova Scotia's Senior Curator and Curator of Contemporary Art. In addition to these duties, Cronin was curator of the first five Sobey Art Award exhibitions.

Early career 
Cronin was born in New York City in 1964, and grew up in Fredericton, New Brunswick. He is a graduate of the Nova Scotia College of Art and Design (Bachelor of Fine Arts) and the University of Windsor (Master of Fine Arts). He is the author of several catalogue essays, as well as numerous articles for Canadian and American art magazines. He was the Visual Arts Columnist for the Daily Gleaner (Fredericton) and Here (Saint John). In 2000, he received the Christina Sabat Award for Critical Review in the Arts.

Curatorial work 
In 2001, he assumed the position of Curator of Contemporary Art at the Art Gallery of Nova Scotia. He was the founding curator of the Sobey Art Award and served as chair of the Sobey jury until 2008. He currently serves on the Sobey Art Award Governance Committee. In 2006 he was appointed Senior Curator at AGNS, and in December 2007 he added the position of Acting Director and Chief Curator to his duties. He was named Director and CEO of AGNS in June 2008. His recent and upcoming curatorial projects include full-career retrospectives of the work of Nancy Edell and David Askevold, as well as the nationally touring exhibitions Graeme Patterson: Woodrow and Arena: The Art of Hockey.  Cronin inherited what he described as a “building falling down around our ears,” an aging complex which no longer has the space for the gallery collection and exhibits. He obtained funding to study a possible new facility in 2011.

Publications 
Cronin is the author of three online art books published by the Art Canada Institute: Alex Colville: Life & Work (2017); Mary Pratt: Life & Work (2020); and Maud Lewis: Life & Work (2021). His book Halifax Art & Artists: An Illustrated History is forthcoming in September 2023.

References

External links 
 Appointment Announcement, Art Gallery of Nova Scotia newsletter May 26, 2008
 http://www.artgalleryofnovascotia.ca

1964 births
Living people
Canadian arts journalists
Canadian art curators
Journalists from New Brunswick
Journalists from New York City
People from Fredericton
21st-century Canadian journalists
Date of birth missing (living people)